Heroes of Stalingrad Square (Ukrainian: Площа Героїв Сталінграду) an area in the Desnyansky district of Chernihiv, at the intersection of Rokossovsky and Vsekhsvyatskaya streets, a historically developed area (district) Bobrovitsky residential area.Previously, the public transport stop along Rokossovsky Street was named after the square, now it is Vsekhsvyatskaya Street.

History
In 1983, the square received its present name - in honor of the 40th anniversary of the end of the Battle of Stalingrad - the most important period of the Great Patriotic War.

Description
At the corner of the intersection of Rokossovsky and Vsekhsvyatskaya streets (opposite Vsekhsvyatskaya street house No. 2), is located in the residential area of Rokossovsky Street near the Niva market and Church of All Saints. A memorial sign to the Heroes of Stalingrad was located, which was dismantled on 7 August 2017 due to an emergency condition.

See also
List of streets and squares in Chernihiv

References

External links
 wikimapia.org

Squares in Chernihiv